Butter tea, also known as Bho jha ("Tibetan tea"), cha süma ("churned tea", Mandarin Chinese: sūyóu chá (酥油茶), su ja ("Churned Tea") in Dzongkha or gur gur cha in the Ladakhi language), is a drink of the people in the Himalayan regions of Nepal, Bhutan, Tibet, Pakistan especially Gilgit-Baltistan) and northern Khyber Pakhtunkhwa, Afghanistan, Kazakhstan, Tajikistan, East Turkestan, Tibet and Western regions of modern-day China, Central Asia and the Caribbean. Traditionally, it is made from tea leaves, yak butter, water, and salt, although butter made from cow's milk is increasingly used, given its wider availability and lower cost.

Butter tea likely originated in the Himalayan region between Greater Tibet and the Indian subcontinent.

History

The history of tea in Tibet dates back to the 7th century during the Tang dynasty. However, butter tea did not become popular in Tibet until about the 13th century, the time of the Phagmodrupa dynasty.

According to legend, a Chinese princess married a king of Tibet which later helped establish trade routes between China and Tibet. These trade routes brought tea into Tibet from China. Later, butter was added to the tea that was brought from China as butter is and was a staple in Tibetan cuisine.

By the 8th century, it was common to drink tea in Tibet. In the 13th century, tea was then used in Tibetan religious ceremonies.

Today, butter tea is still prevalent in Tibet, as citizens drink up to 60 small cups of the tea per day.

Preparation

The highest quality of butter tea is made by boiling pu-erh tea leaves in water for half a day, achieving a dark brown color. It is then skimmed, and poured into a cylinder with fresh yak butter and salt which is then shaken. The result is a liquid that is about the thickness of a stew or thick oil. It is then poured into teapots or jars.

Another method is to boil water and add handfuls of the tea into the water, which is allowed to steep until it turns almost black. Salt is then added, along with a little soda if wanted. The tea is then strained through a horse-hair or reed colander into a wooden butter churn, and a large lump of butter is added. This is then churned until the tea reaches the proper consistency and transferred to copper pots that sit on a brazier to keep them warm. When a churn is not available, a wooden bowl and rapid stirring will suffice.

Each teapot and cup symbolize the standard of living of each family. A ceramic pot is the most widely used, while those made from copper or bronze may be used by families with a higher standard of living.

In the Ganden Monastery in Lhasa, Tibet, they prepare food for around 2,500 monks. During this, they prepare this traditional tea in large cauldrons and kettles. Each night, they boil the water, and the tea itself contains around sixteen bricks of the tea and hundreds of kilograms of butter. Each step comes with its own prayer. Once the tea is ready, one monk sounds the gong to let others know the tea is ready.

Nowadays, when tea leaves, yak butter, and wooden butter churns are not available, people often make butter tea using tea bags, different types of butter available in the market, and a blender to churn.

Customs

Drinking butter tea is a regular part of Tibetan life. Before work, a Tibetan will typically enjoy several bowlfuls of this beverage, and it is always served to guests. Since butter is the main ingredient, butter tea provides plenty of caloric energy and is particularly suited to high altitudes. The butter may also help prevent chapped lips.

According to the Tibetan custom, butter tea is drunk in separate sips, and after each sip, the host refills the bowl to the brim. Thus, the guest never drains his bowl; it is constantly topped up. If the visitor does not wish to drink, the best thing to do is leave the tea untouched until the time comes to leave and then drain the bowl. In this way, etiquette is observed and the host will not be offended.

Another custom recognized by Tibetans is celebrating the birth of their children a few days after the child's birth to dissolve the bad luck the child brings from its mother's womb. Usually the celebration is attended by the parents' friends and relatives, who bring the child gifts including yak butter tea.

Tibetan Buddhism is a common practice and due to such beliefs the yak butter used in the tea is held in high regard such as Karma Palmo. The Tibetan monks would consume the butter tea twice a day and on occasion enjoy the beverage with paksuma, a special rice porridge.

Butter tea is also used for eating tsampa by pouring onto it, or dipping the tsampa into it, and mixing well.

The concentrate, produced by repeatedly boiling tea leaves, will keep for several days and is commonly used in towns. The tea is then combined with salt and butter in a special tea churn (Tibetan: མདོང་མོ་, Wylie: mdong mo), and churned vigorously before serving hot. Now an electric blender is often used.

Although there is no formal ceremony for the preparation of the tea, butter tea is drunk at different Tibetan ceremonies. During a proper Sherpa funeral ceremony, it is custom for the deceased's relatives to invite the guests into their house with a cup of butter tea. During the Tibetan New Year, Losar, ceremonies last for three days in the monasteries. Prior to their long prayers in the afternoon, monks start the morning with butter tea and sweet rice.

Butter tea in Bhutanese culture is also drunk at special occasions such as weddings and Losar. When being hosted, guests are also typically served Suja along with Zao, puffed rice roasted with butter and sugar.

Butter tea in popular culture

Literature 
Butter tea is used in the title of a book of poems by the exiled Tibetan Ten Phun. He was born in Lhasa, Tibet, although the day of his birth is not available. His book Sweet Butter Tea: A Book of Poems contains poems about his childhood. This was his first book of poems that he published in English. Because of this, many of his friends in Dharamsala, India nicknamed him “Sweet Butter Tea". Dharamsala is where he currently resides.

See also 

 Masala chai
 Noon chai
 Bulletproof coffee
 List of butter dishes
 List of Tibetan dishes
 Suutei tsai
 Tibetan cuisine

References

Footnotes

External links

Sherpa Butter Tea

Blended tea
Foods featuring butter
Bhutanese cuisine
Chinese tea
Pakistani tea
Indo-Caribbean cuisine
Nepalese tea
Tibetan cuisine
Tea culture
Black tea